Walter Alfred Thornton (23 February 1858 – 2 February 1915), born Walter Alfred Lee, was an English cricketer active in first-class cricket from 1879 to 1883.

Born to Margaret James and Richard Napoleon Lee at Kensington, Middlesex, Thornton was the third of three brothers. Both his brothers, Richard and Albert played first-class cricket for Kent County Cricket Club. He was educated at Winchester College, where he played for the college cricket team between 1874 and 1876, captaining the team in his final year at school. From Winchester he went up to St John's College, Oxford, where he made his debut in first-class cricket for Oxford University Cricket Club against the Gentlemen of England at the Magdalen Ground in 1879.

Thornton played first-class cricket for the University until 1882, making 22 appearances. He won an Oxford Blue for both cricket and billiards. He made one first-class appearance each for the Marylebone Cricket Club and the Orleans Club in 1883. Across 24 first-class matches, Thornton scored 843 runs with four half centuries and took 27 wickets, with best figures of 4/29. He was made a lieutenant in the Devonshire Regiment in 1883. He died at Blakedown, near Kidderminster, Worcestershire on 2 February 1915. His grandfather was the millionaire Richard Thornton.

Notes

References

External links

1858 births
1915 deaths
Sportspeople from Kensington
People educated at Winchester College
Alumni of St John's College, Oxford
English cricketers
Oxford University cricketers
Marylebone Cricket Club cricketers
Orleans Club cricketers
Devonshire Regiment officers